The 2016–17 Indiana Pacers season was Indiana's 50th season as a franchise and 41st season in the NBA. On May 5, 2016, despite making the playoffs, Pacers' president Larry Bird announced that Frank Vogel's contract would not be renewed, citing a need for "a new voice" to lead the players. On May 16, 2016, the Pacers promoted their assistant head coach Nate McMillan to become their new head coach.

The Pacers would make it to the playoffs, securing the 7th seed. They met the 2nd seeded defending NBA champion Cleveland Cavaliers in the First Round, in which they were swept in four games.

On April 28, 2017, Larry Bird stepped down as the President of the Indiana Pacers.

On June 30, 2017, following the season, Paul George was traded to the Oklahoma City Thunder.

NBA draft

Roster

Standings

Division

Conference

Game log

Preseason

|- style="background:#bfb
| 1
| October 4
| Pelicans
| 
| Al Jefferson (14)
| Thaddeus Young (10)
| Allen, Teague (4)
| Smoothie King Center15,369
| 1–0
|- style="background:#bfb
| 2
| October 6
| Bulls
| 
| Rodney Stuckey (20)
| Al Jefferson (11)
| Rodney Stuckey (7)
| Bankers Life Fieldhouse12,925
| 2–0
|- style="background:#fcc
| 3
| October 8
| @ Bulls
| 
| Jeff Teague (21)
| Glenn Robinson III (6)
| Monta Ellis (6)
| United Center20,096
| 2–1
|- style="background:#bfb
| 4
| October 12
| Bucks
| 
| Rodney Stuckey (21)
| Lavoy Allen (11)
| Rodney Stuckey (5)
| Bankers Life Fieldhouse6,447
| 3–1
|- style="background:#fcc
| 5
| October 14
| @ Magic
| 
| Myles Turner (17)
| Thaddeus Young (8)
| Monta Ellis (6)
| Amway Center14,097
| 3–2
|- style="background:#fcc
| 6
| October 19
| @ Bucks
| 
| Paul George (18)
| Myles Turner (9)
| Ellis, Teague (7)
| BMO Harris Bradley Center5,450
| 3–3

Regular season

|- style="background:#cfc"
| 1
| October 26
| Dallas
| 
| Myles Turner (30)
| Myles Turner (16)
| Jeff Teague (8)
| Bankers Life Fieldhouse17,923
| 1–0
|- style="background:#fcc"
| 2
| October 28
| @ Brooklyn
| 
| Paul George (22)
| Myles Turner (11)
| Jeff Teague (7)
| Barclays Center17,732
| 1–1
|- style="background:#fcc"
| 3
| October 29
| @ Chicago
| 
| George, Turner (20)
| Thaddeus Young (5)
| Jeff Teague (8)
| United Center21,373
| 1–2

|- style="background:#cfc"
| 4
| November 1
| L. A. Lakers
| 
| Paul George (30)
| Paul George (7)
| Jeff Teague (6)
| Bankers Life Fieldhouse17,923
| 2–2
|- style="background:#fcc"
| 5
| November 3
| @ Milwaukee
| 
| Paul George (23)
| Al Jefferson (7)
| Jeff Teague (10)
| BMO Harris Bradley Center11,374
| 2–3
|- style="background:#cfc"
| 6
| November 5
| Chicago
| 
| Jeff Teague (21)
| Paul George (7)
| Monta Ellis (8)
| Bankers Life Fieldhouse17,020
| 3–3
|-style="background:#fcc"
| 7
| November 7
| @ Charlotte
| 
| C.J. Miles (23)
| Al Jefferson (9)
| Aaron Brooks (9)
| Spectrum Center16,880
| 3–4
|- style="background:#cfc"
| 8
| November 9
| Philadelphia
| 
| Jeff Teague (30)
| Myles Turner (9)
| Jeff Teague (9)
| Bankers Life Fieldhouse15,360
| 4–4
|- style="background:#fcc"
| 9
| November 11
| @ Philadelphia
| 
| Paul George (26)
| George, Turner (9)
| Monta Ellis (5)
| Wells Fargo Center17,643
| 4–5
|- style="background:#fcc"
| 10
| November 12
| Boston
| 
| Jeff Teague (20)
| Young, Turner (8)
| Teague, Ellis (4)
| Bankers Life Fieldhouse17,923
| 4–6
|- style="background:#cfc;"
| 11
| November 14
| Orlando
| 
| C.J. Miles (16)
| Kevin Seraphin (10)
| Teague, George (5)
| Bankers Life Fieldhouse14,825
| 5–6
|- style= "background:#cfc;"
| 12
| November 16
| Cleveland
| 
| Paul George (21)
| Paul George (11)
| Jeff Teague (8)
| Bankers Life Fieldhouse 17,923
| 6–6
|- style="background:#fcc;"
| 13
| November 18
| Phoenix
| 
| Myles Turner (22)
| Myles Turner (6)
| Jeff Teague (7)
| Bankers Life Fieldhouse16,780
| 6–7
|- style="background:#cfc;"
| 14
| November 20
| @ Oklahoma City
| 
| Jeff Teague (30)
| Young, Robinson III (11)
| Jeff Teague (9)
| Chesapeake Energy Arena18,203
| 7–7
|- style="background:#fcc;"
| 15
| November 21
| Golden State
| 
| Rodney Stuckey (21)
| Kevin Seraphin (14)
| Teague, Brooks (3)
| Bankers Life Fieldhouse17,923
| 7–8
|- style="background:#fcc;"
| 16
| November 23
| Atlanta
| 
| Thaddeus Young (24)
| Myles Turner (9)
| Jeff Teague (8)
| Bankers Life Fieldhouse16,032
| 7–9
|- style="background:#cfc;"
| 17
| November 25
| Brooklyn
| 
| Glenn Robinson III (20)
| Jeff Teague (9)
| Jeff Teague (8)
| Bankers Life Fieldhouse16,083
| 8–9
|- style="background:#cfc;"
| 18
| November 27
| L. A. Clippers
| 
| Turner, Robinson III (17)
| Myles Turner (12)
| Jeff Teague (10)
| Bankers Life Fieldhouse15,572
| 9–9
|- style="background:#fcc;"
| 19
| November 30
| @ Portland
| 
| Jeff Teague (25)
| Myles Turner (10)
| Jeff Teague (8)
| Moda Center19,107
| 9–10

|- style="background:#cfc;"
| 20
| December 4
| @ L. A. Clippers
| 
| Thaddeus Young (17)
| Young, George (7)
| Teague, Turner, Stuckey (3)
| Staples Center19,060
| 10–10
|- style="background:#fcc;"
| 21
| December 5
| @ Golden State
| 
| Paul George (21)
| Paul George (10)
| Jeff Teague (6)
| Oracle Arena19,596
| 10–11
|- style="background:#cfc;"
| 22
| December 7
| @ Phoenix
| 
| Paul George (25)
| Paul George (13)
| Jeff Teague (11)
| Talking Stick Resort Arena17,452
| 11–11
|- style="background:#fcc;"
| 23
| December 9
| @ Dallas
| 
| Paul George (22)
| Paul George (7)
| Rodney Stuckey (8)
| American Airlines Center19,486
| 11–12
|- style="background:#cfc;"
| 24
| December 10
| Portland
| 
| Paul George (37)
| Thaddeus Young (9)
| Jeff Teague (6)
| Bankers Life Fieldhouse16,211
| 12–12
|- style="background:#cfc;"
| 25
| December 12
| Charlotte
| 
| Turner, George (22)
| Myles Turner (7)
| Jeff Teague (11)
| Bankers Life Fieldhouse14,138
| 13–12
|- style="background:#fcc;"
| 26
| December 14
| @ Miami
| 
| Paul George (22)
| Turner, Young, George (7)
| Jeff Teague (5)
| American Airlines Arena19,600
| 13–13
|- style="background:#fcc;"
| 27
| December 15
| @ New Orleans
| 
| Myles Turner (26)
| Thaddeus Young (9)
| Jeff Teague (10)
| Smoothie King Center15,472
| 13–14
|- style="background:#cfc;"
| 28
| December 17
| @ Detroit
| 
| Paul George (26)
| Glenn Robinson III (12)
| Jeff Teague (7)
| Palace of Auburn Hills15,231
| 14–14
|- style="background:#cfc;"
| 29
| December 19
| Washington
| 
| Paul George (27)
| Thaddeus Young (11)
| Jeff Teague (10)
| Bankers Life Fieldhouse17,686
| 15–14
|- style="background:#fcc;"
| 30
| December 20
| @ New York
| 
| Thaddeus Young (21)
| Myles Turner (9)
| Jeff Teague (12)
| Madison Square Garden19,812
| 15–15
|- style="background:#fcc;"
| 31
| December 22
| Boston
| 
| Jeff Teague (21)
| Thaddeus Young (12)
| Jeff Teague (8)
| Bankers Life Fieldhouse17,577
| 15–16
|- style="background:#fcc;"
| 32
| December 26
| @ Chicago
| 
| Aaron Brooks (19)
| Myles Turner (8)
| Paul George (8)
| United Center21,922
| 15–17
|- style="background:#fcc;"
| 33
| December 28
| @ Washington
| 
| Paul George (34)
| Myles Turner (8)
| Jeff Teague (11)
| Verizon Center16,172
| 15–18
|- style="background:#cfc;"
| 34
| December 30
| Chicago
| 
| Paul George (37)
| Glenn Robinson III (10)
| Jeff Teague (17)
| Bankers Life Fieldhouse17,923
| 16–18

|- style="background:#cfc;"
| 35
| January 1
| Orlando
| 
| Myles Turner (23)
| Myles Turner (12)
| Jeff Teague (9)
| Bankers Life Fieldhouse17,530
| 17–18
|- style="background:#cfc;"
| 36
| January 3
| @ Detroit
| 
| Paul George (32)
| Myles Turner (7)
| Jeff Teague (8)
| Palace of Auburn Hills13,435
| 18–18
|- style="background:#cfc;"
| 37
| January 5
| Brooklyn
| 
| Paul George (26)
| Myles Turner (15)
| Jeff Teague (15)
| Bankers Life Fieldhouse16,421
| 19–18
|- style="background:#cfc;"
| 38
| January 7
| New York
| 
| Teague, George (19)
| Myles Turner (10)
| Jeff Teague (8)
| Bankers Life Fieldhouse17,367
| 20–18
|- style="background:#fcc;"
| 39
| January 12
| @ Denver
| 
| C.J Miles (20)
| Myles Turner (6)
| Jeff Teague (9)
| The O2 Arena20,000
| 20–19
|- style="background:#cfc;"
| 40
| January 16
| New Orleans
| 
| Paul George (19)
| Myles Turner (12)
| Jeff Teague (10)
| Bankers Life Fieldhouse15,545
| 21–19
|- style= "background:#cfc;"
| 41
| January 18
| @ Sacramento
| 
| Paul George (25)
| Jeff Teague (7)
| Jeff Teague (11)
| Golden 1 Center17,608
| 22–19
|- style=background:#fcc;"
| 42
| January 20
| @ L. A. Lakers
| 
| Paul George (21)
| George, Jefferson (6)
| Jeff Teague (7)
| Staples Center18,412
| 22–20
|- style="background:#fcc;"
| 43
| January 21
| @ Utah
| 
| Young, George, Teague (19)
| Thaddeus Young (9)
| Jeff Teague (7)
| Vivint Smart Home Arena19,911
| 22–21
|- style="background:#fcc;"
| 44
| January 23
| New York
| 
| Paul George (31)
| Myles Turner (10)
| Jeff Teague (7)
| Bankers Life Fieldhouse16,015
| 22–22
|- style="background:#cfc;"
| 45
| January 26
| @ Minnesota
| 
| Paul George (32)
| Jeff Teague (8)
| Jeff Teague (13)
| Target Center14,862
| 23–22
|- style="background:#cfc;"
| 46
| January 27
| Sacramento
| 
| Paul George (33)
| Jeff Teague (8)
| Jeff Teague (8)
| Bankers Life Fieldhouse17,522
| 24–22
|- style="background:#cfc;"
| 47
| January 29
| Houston
| 
| Paul George (33)
| Myles Turner (10)
| Jeff Teague (15)
| Bankers Life Fieldhouse17,923
| 25–22

|- style="background:#cfc;"
| 48
| February 1
| @ Orlando
| 
| C.J. Miles (16)
| Paul George (7)
| Jeff Teague (9)
| Amway Center16,662
| 26–22
|- style="background:#cfc;"
| 49
| February 3
| @ Brooklyn
| 
| George, Teague (24)
| Paul George (11)
| Jeff Teague (7)
| Barclays Center14,557
| 27–22
|- style="background:#cfc;"
| 50
| February 4
| Detroit
| 
| Paul George (21)
| Lavoy Allen (11)
| Jeff Teague (7)
| Bankers Life Fieldhouse17,660
| 28–22
|- style="background:#cfc;"
| 51
| February 6
| Oklahoma City
| 
| Paul George (21)
| Paul George (8)
| George, Ellis (4)
| Bankers Life Fieldhouse16,123
| 29–22
|- style= "background:#fcc;"
| 52
| February 8
| Cleveland
| 
| C.J. Miles (23)
| Paul George (8)
| Jeff Teague (14)
| Bankers Life Fieldhouse17,580
| 29–23
|- style= "background:#fcc;"
| 53
| February 10
| @ Washington
| 
| Paul George (31)
| Al Jefferson (8)
| Jeff Teague (9)
| Verizon Center19,503
| 29–24
|- style= "background:#fcc;"
| 54
| February 11
| Milwaukee
| 
| C.J. Miles (23)
| Paul George (8)
| Teague, Turner (6)
| Bankers Life Fieldhouse17,923
| 29–25
|- style= "background:#fcc;"
| 55
| February 13
| San Antonio
| 
| Myles Turner (22)
| George, Turner (6)
| Jeff Teague (5)
| Bankers Life Fieldhouse15,203
| 29–26
|- style= "background:#fcc;"
| 56
| February 15
| @ Cleveland
| 
| Glenn Robinson III (19)
| George, Turner (7)
| Jeff Teague (11)
| Quicken Loans Arena20,562
| 29–27
|- style= "background:#fcc;"
| 57
| February 16
| Washington
| 
| George, Turner (17)
| Myles Turner (9)
| Monta Ellis (7)
| Bankers Life Fieldhouse17,233
| 29–28
|- style= "background:#cfc;"
| 58
| February 24
| Memphis
| 
| C.J. Miles (17)
| Lavoy Allen (10)
| Jeff Teague (10)
| Bankers Life Fieldhouse17,923
| 30–28
|- style="background:#fcc;"
| 59
| February 25
| @ Miami
| 
| Myles Turner (18)
| Turner, Christmas (7)
| Jeff Teague (6)
| AmericanAirlines Arena19,600
| 30–29
|- style="background:#cfc;"
| 60
| February 27
| @ Houston
| 
| Jeff Teague (25)
| Lavoy Allen (11)
| Monta Ellis (8)
| Toyota Center18,055
| 31–29

|- style=background:#fcc;"
| 61
| March 1
| @ San Antonio
| 
| Paul George (22)
| George, Turner, Miles (6)
| Jeff Teague (9)
| AT&T Center18,418
| 31–30
|- style=background:#cfc;"
| 62
| March 5
| @ Atlanta
| 
| Paul George (34)
| Al Jefferson (8)
| Jeff Teague (6)
| Philips Arena15,366
| 32–30
|-style="background:#fcc;"
| 63
| March 6
| @ Charlotte
| 
| Paul George (36)
| Paul George (10)
| Jeff Teague (8)
| Spectrum Center16,387
| 32–31
|-style="background:#cfc;"
| 64
| March 8
| Detroit
| 
| Paul George (22)
| George, Turner (8)
| Rodney Stuckey (7)
| Bankers Life Fieldhouse14,353
| 33–31
|- style="background:#fcc;"
| 65
| March 10
| @ Milwaukee
| 
| Paul George (18)
| Paul George (11)
| Paul George (6)
| Bradley Center16,177
| 33–32
|- style="background:#cfc;"
| 66
| March 12
| Miami
| 
| Paul George (28)
| Paul George (10)
| Jeff Teague (4)
| Bankers Life Fieldhouse17,923
| 34–32
|- style="background:#fcc;"
| 67
| March 14
| @ New York
| 
| Paul George (22)
| Myles Turner (12)
| Jeff Teague (6)
| Madison Square Garden18,261
| 34–33
|- style="background:#cfc;"
| 68
| March 15
| Charlotte
| 
| Paul George (39)
| Myles Turner (11)
| Jeff Teague (11)
| Bankers Life Fieldhouse14,169
| 35–33
|- style="background:#fcc;"
| 69
| March 19
| @ Toronto
| 
| Paul George (18)
| Christmas, Turner (5)
| Jeff Teague (7)
| Air Canada Centre19,800
| 35–34
|- style="background:#cfc;"
| 70
| March 20
| Utah
| 
| Jeff Teague (21)
| George, Young (8)
| George, Teague (5)
| Bankers Life Fieldhouse15,458
| 36–34
|- style="background:#fcc;"
| 71
| March 22
| @ Boston
| 
| Paul George (37)
| Myles Turner (9)
| Jeff Teague (6)
| TD Garden18,624
| 36–35
|- style="background:#fcc;"
| 72
| March 24
| Denver
| 
| Paul George (27)
| Paul George (9)
| Jeff Teague (8)
| Bankers Life Fieldhouse17,923
| 36–36
|- style="background:#cfc;"
| 73
| March 26
| Philadelphia
| 
| Paul George (21)
| Myles Turner (16)
| Jeff Teague (4)
| Bankers Life Fieldhouse16,467
| 37–36
|- style="background:#fcc;"
| 74
| March 28
| Minnesota
| 
| Paul George (37)
| Myles Turner (8)
| Jeff Teague (10)
| Bankers Life Fieldhouse17,534
| 37–37
|- style="background:#fcc;"
| 75
| March 29
| @ Memphis
| 
| Paul George (22)
| Thaddeus Young (13)
| Jeff Teague (5)
| FedExForum16,367
| 37–38
|- style="background:#fcc;"
| 76
| March 31
| @ Toronto
| 
| Paul George (28)
| George, Turner (9)
| Jeff Teague (5)
| Air Canada Centre19,800
| 37–39

|- style=background:#fcc;"
| 77
| April 2
| @ Cleveland
| 
| Paul George (47)
| George, Young (9)
| Jeff Teague (11)
| Quicken Loans Arena20,562
| 37–40
|- style=background:#cfc;"
| 78
| April 4
| Toronto
| 
| Paul George (35)
| Thaddeus Young (11)
| Jeff Teague (6)
| Bankers Life Fieldhouse16,524
| 38–40
|- style=background:#cfc;"
| 79
| April 6
| Milwaukee
| 
| Paul George (23)
| Thaddeus Young (11)
| Jeff Teague (7)
| Bankers Life Fieldhouse17,010
| 39–40
|- style=background:#cfc;"
| 80
| April 8
| @ Orlando
| 
| Paul George (37)
| Myles Turner (8)
| Jeff Teague (10)
| Amway Center18,846
| 40–40
|- style=background:#cfc;"
| 81
| April 10
| @ Philadelphia
| 
| Paul George (27)
| Myles Turner (13)
| Jeff Teague (6)
| Wells Fargo Center14,622
| 41–40
|- style=background:#cfc;"
| 82
| April 12
| Atlanta
| 
| Paul George (32)
| Paul George (11)
| Jeff Teague (7)
| Bankers Life Fieldhouse17,923
| 42–40

Playoffs

|- style="background:#fcc;"
| 1
| April 15
| @ Cleveland
| 
| Paul George (29)
| Thaddeus Young (9)
| Paul George (7)
| Quicken Loans Arena20,562
| 0–1
|- style="background:#fcc;"
| 2
| April 17
| @ Cleveland
| 
| Paul George (32)
| Paul George (8)
| Paul George (7)
| Quicken Loans Arena20,562
| 0–2
|- style="background:#fcc;"
| 3
| April 20
| Cleveland
| 
| Paul George (36)
| Paul George (15)
| Paul George (6)
| Bankers Life Fieldhouse17,923
| 0–3
|- style="background:#fcc;"
| 4
| April 23
| Cleveland
| 
| Lance Stephenson (22)
| Thaddeus Young (10)
| Jeff Teague (10)
| Bankers Life Fieldhouse17,923
| 0–4

Player statistics

Regular season

Playoffs

Player Statistics Citation:

Transactions

Trades

Free agents

Re-signed

Additions

Subtractions

References

Indiana Pacers seasons
Indiana Pacers
Indiana Pacers
Indiana Pacers